Hall and Prentice was an architectural firm established in 1919 in Brisbane, Queensland, Australia, through the partnership of Thomas Ramsay Hall (T. R. Hall) and George Gray Prentice (G. G. Prentice). The firm designed many prestigious buildings in the Brisbane area, including Musket Villa, Brisbane City Hall, Sandgate Town Hall and the Tattersalls Club.

In 1930 Hall left the firm to partner with Lionel Blythewood Phillips. In 1931 Prentice entered into a partnership with William 'Bill' Atkinson to form Atkinson Prentice.

References

Attribution 

Architects from Brisbane
Australian companies established in 1919
Design companies established in 1919
Companies based in Brisbane
Articles incorporating text from the Queensland Heritage Register
Design companies disestablished in 1930
1930 disestablishments in Australia